Frank Pullein  ARCO (1871 - 1 March 1954) was an organist and composer based in England.

Life

He was born in 1871, the son of William Pullein and Hannah Rose. His father was a Professor of Music.

His three brothers, William Rose Pullein, John Pullein and Ernest Pullein were also organists.

He was in the choir of Lincoln Cathedral as a boy, and then an articled pupil of John Matthew Wilson Young and then assistant organist.

He moved to Wrexham in 1895 where he stayed until his death in 1954.

Appointments

Assistant organist at Lincoln Cathedral 1893 - 1894 
Organist of St Giles' Church, Wrexham 1895 - 1954

Compositions

He composed:
A Solemn March 1904

References

1871 births
1954 deaths
English organists
British male organists
English composers